The International Belgian Open is an international track cycling meeting held at the Vlaams Wielercentrum Eddy Merckx in Ghent, Belgium. The first edition took place in 2013.

Winners 
Men

Women

References

Track cycling races
Cycle races in Belgium
Sports competitions in Ghent
Recurring sporting events established in 2013